SS Southern Cross may refer to:

 , a sealing vessel
 , an ocean liner belonging to the Munson Line; later USS Wharton (AP-7) during World War II
 , a heavy lift ship
 , an ocean liner

See also
 Southern Cross (disambiguation)

Ship names